Ninepipe National Wildlife Refuge is a  National Wildlife Refuge and unit of the National Bison Range Complex, located in Lake County, Montana.

Description
Most of the Ninepipe National Wildlife Refuge is a reservoir so the exposed land area is only  in a narrow band around the reservoir. Ninepipe is managed by the U.S. Fish and Wildlife Service, an agency under the U.S. Department of the Interior.

Ninepipe is a prime nesting habitat for numerous bird species such as the grebe, Canada goose, bittern, great blue heron and various species of ducks. Nesting platforms for ospreys at one end of the lake provide added habitat for this predatory species. Mammals include muskrat, badger and porcupine live within the refuge, and grizzly bears have been known to venture out of the Mission Range mountains onto the refuge.

The refuge is located right off of U.S. Highway 93. The refuge is not permanently staffed and has no improvements. It is managed as an easement and the federal jurisdiction pertains solely to species and habitat protection. As a part of the National Bison Range Complex, this refuge is managed from the headquarters of the National Bison Range.

See also

References

External links
 Ninepipe National Wildlife Refuge

National Bison Range Complex
National Wildlife Refuges in Montana
Protected areas of Lake County, Montana